Cue sports (Spanish: Billar), for the 2013 Bolivarian Games, took place from 18 November to 22 November 2013.

Medal table
Key:

Medal summary

Men

Women

References

Events at the 2013 Bolivarian Games
2013 in cue sports
2013 Bolivarian Games
Cue sports in Peru